Yousef Ahmed Safar (Arabic:يوسف أحمد صفر; born 17 May 1989) is an Emirati footballer who plays as a goalkeeper for Ajman Club .

External links

References

1988 births
Emirati footballers
Emirati people of Baloch descent
Living people
Dubai CSC players
Ajman Club players
UAE Pro League players
UAE First Division League players
Association football goalkeepers
Place of birth missing (living people)